Andriy Andriyovych Khloptsov (born 10 December 1998) is a Ukrainian swimmer. He won gold and bronze medals at the 2015 European Games.

References

1998 births
Living people
Ukrainian male swimmers
Swimmers at the 2015 European Games
European Games medalists in swimming
European Games gold medalists for Ukraine
European Games bronze medalists for Ukraine
Swimmers at the 2014 Summer Youth Olympics
Universiade medalists in swimming
Universiade silver medalists for Ukraine
Universiade bronze medalists for Ukraine
Medalists at the 2017 Summer Universiade
21st-century Ukrainian people